Gamasellus ezoensis is a species of mite in the family Ologamasidae.

References

ezoensis
Articles created by Qbugbot
Animals described in 1983